G protein-coupled receptor 119 also known as GPR119 is a G protein-coupled receptor that in humans is encoded by the GPR119 gene.

GPR119, along with GPR55 and GPR18, have been implicated as novel cannabinoid receptors.

Pharmacology 

GPR119 is expressed predominantly in the pancreas and gastrointestinal tract in rodents and humans, as well as in the brain in rodents. Activation of the receptor has been shown to cause a reduction in food intake and body weight gain in rats. GPR119 has also been shown to regulate incretin and insulin hormone secretion. As a result, new drugs acting on the receptor have been suggested as novel treatments for obesity and diabetes.

Ligands 

A number of endogenous and synthetic ligands for this receptor have been identified:

 2-Oleoylglycerol
 Anandamide
 AR-231,453
 MBX-2982
 Oleoylethanolamide (Endogenous Ligand) 
 PSN-375,963
 PSN-632,408

References

Further reading 

 
 

G protein-coupled receptors